Kaiser Wilhelm II was a German Emperor.

Kaiser Wilhelm II may also refer to:
 Kaiser Wilhelm II Land, Antarctica
 Feste Kaiser Wilhelm II or Fort de Mutzig, a fortress in Alsace

See also
 List of ships named SS Kaiser Wilhelm II
 Kaiser Wilhelm (disambiguation)
 Wilhelm II (disambiguation)